Willie Barrett is an Irish former hurling referee.  A native of Ardfinnan in County Tipperary, he was one of the sport's top referees and officiated at several All-Ireland finals in minor, under-21 levels, and two senior finals: in 1994 and 2000.

His refereeing career spanned from 1976 until 2018 and he also served as chairman of the national referees development committee.

References

Donegan, Des, The Complete Handbook of Gaelic Games (DBA Publications Limited, 2005).

Year of birth missing (living people)
Living people
Gaelic games administrators
Hurling referees